("Quantum theoretical re-interpretation of kinematic and mechanical relations") was a breakthrough article in quantum mechanics written by Werner Heisenberg, which appeared in Zeitschrift für Physik in September 1925.

Heisenberg worked on the article while recovering from hay fever on the island of Heligoland, corresponding with Wolfgang Pauli on the subject.  When asked for his opinion of the manuscript, Pauli responded favorably, but Heisenberg said that he was still "very uncertain about it".  In July 1925, he sent the manuscript to Max Born to review and decide whether to submit it for publication.

In the article, Heisenberg tried to explain the energy levels of a one-dimensional anharmonic oscillator, avoiding the concrete but unobservable representations of electron orbits by using observable parameters such as transition probabilities for quantum jumps, which necessitated using two indexes corresponding to the initial and final states.

Also included was the Heisenberg commutator, his law of multiplication needed to describe certain properties of atoms, whereby the product of two physical quantities did not commute. Therefore, PQ would differ from QP where, for example, P was an electron's momentum, and Q its  position. Paul Dirac, who had received a proof copy in August 1925, realized that the commutative law had not been fully developed, and he produced an algebraic formulation to express the same results in more logical form.

Historical context
The article laid the groundwork for matrix mechanics, later developed further by Born and Pascual Jordan. When Born read the article, he recognized the formulation as one which could be transcribed and extended to the systematic language of matrices.  Born, with the help of his assistant and former student Pascual Jordan, began immediately to make the transcription and extension, and they submitted their results for publication; their manuscript was received for publication just 60 days after Heisenberg’s article. A follow-on article by all three authors extending the theory to multiple dimensions was submitted for publication before the end of the year.

See also
 Heisenberg's entryway to matrix mechanics
 History of quantum mechanics
 Mathematical formulation of quantum mechanics
 Matrix mechanics

References

Further reading

 
 An English translation may be found in

External links
 Full text of the article PDF. www.psiquadrat.de. Consulted on 12 June 2021.
 First page of the article
 English abstract

Historical physics publications
1925 in science
1925 documents
1925 in Germany
Physics papers
Works originally published in German magazines
Works originally published in science and technology magazines
Werner Heisenberg